St Philip's Christian College is a multi-campus independent non-denominational Christian co-educational early learning, primary and secondary day school, located in the Central Coast and Hunter regions of New South Wales, Australia.

History 
The school was founded in 1982 by St Philip's Anglican Church Waratah, with the aim of 'whole child' education – to assist the intellectual, social, physical and spiritual skills of students. The school's motto is "The Way, The Truth, and The Life". St Philip's Christian College Newcastle has over 1400 students enrolled from Year K to Year 12.

St Philip's has a 500-seat theatre on site and purchased the old St Philip's Anglican church site. This site has been refurbished to be the Centre of Sports Education.

St Philip's Christian College Port Stephens, established in 1995, has an enrolment of over 700 students from Kindergarten to Year Twelve. In 1997, an alternative school for students at risk or autism spectrum disorder (Years 7–10) named DALE (Dynamic Alternate Learning Environment) was established.

In October 1997 the College acquired Narnia Preschool. There are now six Narnia Christian Preschool and Early Childhood centres, most catering for children from 0 to 5 years.

In 2001, the Waratah campus was restructured into a Junior School (K-4), Middle School (5–8) and Senior School (9–12).

In 2005, the college acquired Cessnock Christian School which was renamed to St Philip's Christian College Cessnock. The Cessnock school now has over 1000 students and is situated on a 100-acre site at Nulkaba near the vineyards. In 2007 Gosford Christian College on the Central Coast suburb of Narara was acquired. Renamed St Philip's Christian College Gosford, it has over 600 students ranging from Kindergarten to Year 12.

St Philip's Christian College has international links with schools in Hong Kong and other parts of Asia. 

Across all campuses students can access a range of academic, leadership, sporting and community opportunities. St Philip's Christian College students regularly participate in competitions such as The Da Vinci Decathlon, the NSW Combined Independent School Sports events and the APSMO Mathematics Games. Students also participate in community service projects. Students have annual year based camps which generally focus on outdoor education and team building exercises. Graduating Year 12 students can participate in an 'alternative schoolies week' in Vanuatu. 

St Philip's Christian College Waratah (Newcastle) is considered one of the best creative arts schools in the region, with their biennial musicals renowned for their high quality. 

The largest community event of the Cessnock school is the Spring Fair held every September.

The St Philip's group of schools is governed by St Philip's Christian Education Foundation in Newcastle, NSW, Australia.

See also

 List of non-government schools in New South Wales

References

External links 
 St. Philip's Christian College website

Educational institutions established in 1982
Nondenominational Christian schools in New South Wales
Junior School Heads Association of Australia Member Schools
1982 establishments in Australia
Private primary schools in New South Wales
Private secondary schools in New South Wales
Central Coast (New South Wales)
Hunter Region